Fall into  Spring is a 1974 album by Rita Coolidge and was released on the A&M Records label.

Track listing

Side one
"Love Has No Pride" (Eric Kaz, Libby Titus) — 3:50
"That's What Friends Are For" (Paul Williams) — 4:55
"Cowboys and Indians" (Bobby Charles) — 3:15
"Hold an Old Friend's Hand" (Donna Weiss) — 4:10
"We Had It All" (Troy Seals, Donnie Fritts) — 3:00
"Mama Lou" (Larry Murray) — 3:13

Side two
"Heaven's Dream" (Marc Benno) — 2:25
"Desperados Waiting for the Train" (Guy Clark) — 5:15
"A Nickel For The Fiddler" (Guy Clark) — 2:50
"The Burden of Freedom" (Kris Kristofferson) — 5:14
"Now Your Baby Is a Lady" (Donna Weiss, Jackie DeShannon) — 2:40
"I Feel Like Going Home" (Charlie Rich) — 5.27

Personnel
Rita Coolidge - vocals
Dean Parks – acoustic and electric guitars, slide guitar, mandolin, dobro
Jerry McGee – acoustic and electric guitar, harmonica
Mike Utley – keyboards
Lee Sklar – bass
Sammy Creason – drums
Bobbye Hall – percussion
Al Perkins – pedal steel guitar
Nick DeCaro - accordion
Milt Holland – vibraphone, marimbas
Gib Guilbeau – fiddle
Herb Pedersen – banjo
Geoff Levin – dobro and energy bow on "Desperados Waiting For the Train"
Booker T. Jones – piano and vocal on "Hold An Old Friend's Hand"
Jennifer Warren, Brooks Hunnicutt, Rita Jean Bodine, Linda Dillard, Kenny Edwards, Andrew Gold, Donna Weiss, Booker T. Jones, Priscilla Jones – vocals on "Desperados Waiting For The Train" 
David Campbell - orchestral arrangements
Technical
John Haeny, Ric Tarantini, Kent Nebergall, Brian Dall'armil - recording engineer
David Anderle; with aid & assistance from Brian Dall'armi and Kent Nebergall - remixing engineer
Roland Young - art direction
Chuck Beeson - design
Gina Fiore - photography

Charts

References

Rita Coolidge albums
1974 albums
Albums arranged by David Campbell (composer)
Albums produced by David Anderle
A&M Records albums
Albums recorded at Sunset Sound Recorders